Bekhteyevo is a rural locality (a selo) and the administrative center of Bekhteyevskoye Rural Settlement, Korochansky District, Belgorod Oblast, Russia. Population:   There are 23 streets.

Geography 
Bekhteyevo is located 2 km southeast of Korocha (the district's administrative centre) by road. Kazanka is the nearest rural locality.

References 

Rural localities in Korochansky District